Gold-filled jewelry is jewelry composed of a solid layer of gold (typically constituting at least 5% of the item's total weight) mechanically bonded to a base of either sterling silver or some base metal. The related terms "rolled gold plate" and "gold overlay" may legally be used in some contexts if the layer of gold constitutes less than 5% of the item's weight.

Most high quality gold-filled pieces have the same appearance as high carat gold, and gold-filled items, even with daily wear, can last 10 to 30 years though the layer of gold will eventually wear off exposing the metal underneath. The layer of gold on gold-filled items is 5 to 10 times thicker than that produced by regular gold plating, and 15 to 25 times thicker than that produced by gold electroplate (sometimes stamped HGE for "high grade electroplate" or HGP for "heavy gold plate", which have neither of them any legal meaning and indicate only that the item is gold plated).

Definition 
In the United States, the quality of gold-filled jewelry is defined by the Federal Trade Commission (FTC). If the gold layer is 10kt fineness, the minimum weight of the plated layer on an item stamped "GF" must equal at least  of the total weight of the item. If the gold layer is 12 kt or higher, the minimum layer of karat gold in an item stamped "GF" must equal at least  the total weight of the item. The most common stamps found on gold-filled jewelry are  12kt GF and  14kt GF. Also common is  10kt. These standards are for modern gold-filled items. It is not uncommon to see  14kt gold-filled marks, plus many other variations, on items from the 1930s, 1940s, etc., which would have to be marked "Rolled Gold Plate".

The Federal Trade Commission allows the use of the terms "rolled gold plate," "R.G.P" or "gold overlay" on items with lower thicknesses of gold than are required for "gold-filled." An example would be an item stamped as " 10kt RGP" meaning that the object is plated with 10kt gold at a thickness that makes weight of the plated layer equal to one-fortieth of the weight of the metal parts of the object.

"Double clad" gold-filled sheet is produced with  the thickness of gold on each side. On-twentieth 14Kt double clad gold-filled has a layer on each side of  14Kt making the total content of gold . The thinner layer on each side does not wear as well as single clad gold-filled.

See also 
 Costume jewelry
 Vermeil

References 

Precious metals
Types of jewellery